2-deoxy-D-gluconate 3-dehydrogenase is an enzyme that catalyzes the chemical reaction

2-deoxy-D-gluconate + NAD+  3-dehydro-2-deoxy-D-gluconate + NADH + H+

Thus, the two substrates of this enzyme are 2-deoxy-D-gluconate and NAD+, whereas its 3 products are 3-dehydro-2-deoxy-D-gluconate, NADH, and H+.

This enzyme belongs to the family of oxidoreductases, specifically those acting on the CH-OH group of donor with NAD+ or NADP+ as acceptor.  The systematic name of this enzyme class is 2-deoxy-D-gluconate:NAD+ 3-oxidoreductase. This enzyme is also called 2-deoxygluconate dehydrogenase.  This enzyme participates in pentose and glucuronate interconversions.

Structural studies

As of late 2007, only one structure has been solved for this class of enzymes, with the PDB accession code .

References 

 

EC 1.1.1
NADH-dependent enzymes
Enzymes of known structure